Tooro United F.C. is a Ugandan football club from Fort Portal currently playing in the top division of Ugandan football, the Star Times Uganda Premier League.

History
The club was founded in 2007 as Soana F.C. and played at the Kavumba ground in Wakiso. They were named after an investments company.

Soana were promoted to the Ugandan Super League for the first time in 2013, where they quickly made a name for themselves by winning their first four games of the season and ultimately finished fifth.

In 2018, the club's chairman, who was from the Tooro region of Uganda, decided to move the team to Fort Portal.

Since that time, Smart Obed sold the club to Mdm Alice Namatovu who has helped the club move from Big League all the way to Star Times Uganda Premier League. With the change of the executive we are seeing the club go from amateur to a professional sports club. Mdm President Alice Namatovu has a vision of turning it into a true sporting club as we see on the international stage.

www.toorounitedfc.com

Stadium
Currently the team plays at the 5000 capacity Buhinga Playground in Fort Portal.

League participations
Ugandan Super League: 2013–2017 
Ugandan Second Division: 2007-2013
Star Times Uganda Premier League: 2017–present

References

External links
Soccerway
http://www.soccervista.com/team.php?teamid=474572

Football clubs in Uganda